Energy in Macau is related to all of the type of energy and its related infrastructure used in Macau, China. Energy-related affairs is administered under the Secretariat for Transport and Public Works of the Government of Macau.

Natural gas
Macau import its natural gas supply from Hengqin Island in Zhuhai, Guangdong. The pipeline has a capacity of 520 million m3 of natural gas per year. The sole gas importer in Macau is Sinosky Energy (Holdings) Co. Ltd..

Petroleum
Petroleum and other petrochemical products in Macau is handled by Nam Kwong Petroleum & Chemical Co., Ltd. (NKOIL) from its trading, storage, transportation, wholesale and retail, including the installation and maintenance of gas and fuel supply system.

Water supply
Water supply in Macau is handled by Macao Water.

See also
 Energy policy of China
 Electricity sector in Macau

References

 
Macau